Norman Cross Prison in Huntingdonshire, England, was the world's first purpose-built prisoner-of-war camp or "depot", built in 1796–97 to hold prisoners of war from France and its allies during the French Revolutionary Wars and Napoleonic Wars. After the Treaty of Amiens the depot was emptied of prisoners and, in 1816, largely demolished.

Norman Cross lies south of Peterborough, Cambridgeshire, between the villages of Folksworth, Stilton and Yaxley.  The junction of the A1 and A15 roads is here. Traditionally in Huntingdonshire, Norman Cross gave its name to one of the hundreds of Huntingdonshire and, from 1894 to 1974, to Norman Cross Rural District.

Design and construction of prison camp

The Royal Navy Transport Board was responsible for the care of prisoners of war. When Sir Ralph Abercromby communicated in 1796 that he was transferring 4,000 prisoners from the West Indies, the Board began the search for a site for a new prison. The site had a good water supply and close to sufficient local sources of food to sustain many thousands of prisoners and the guards. Work commenced in December 1796 with much of the timber building prefabricated in London and assembled on site. 500 carpenters and labourers worked on the site for 3 months. The cost of construction was £34,581 11s 3d.

The design of the prison was based on that of a contemporary artillery fort. The barracks for the garrison were placed outside and a large guard house (known as the Block House) containing troops and six cannon was placed right at the centre. The interior of the prison was divided into four quadrangles, each with four double-storey wooden accommodation blocks for 500 prisoners and four ablutions blocks. One accommodation block was reserved for officers. Half of each quadrangle was a large exercise yard. The north-east quadrangle contained the prison hospital. There was also a windowless block known as the Black Hole in which prisoners were kept shackled on half rations as punishment, mainly for violence towards the guards although two prisoners were sent to the Black Hole for "infamous vices". 30 wells were sunk to draw drinking water for the prisoners and garrison.

Operation

The average prison population was about 5,500 men. The lowest number recorded was 3,300 in October 1804 and 6,272 on 10 April 1810 was the highest number of prisoners recorded in any official document.

Norman Cross was intended to be a model depot providing the most humane treatment of prisoners of war. Sir Rupert George was responsible for the "care and custody" of the French prisoners.

Most of the men held in the prison were low-ranking soldiers and sailors, including midshipmen and junior officers, with a small number of privateers. About 100 senior officers and some civilians "of good social standing", mainly passengers on captured ships and the wives of some officers, were given parole d'honneur outside the prison, mainly in Peterborough although some as far away as Northampton, Plymouth, Melrose and Abergavenny. They were afforded the courtesy of their rank within English society. Some "with good private means" hired servants and often dined out while wearing full uniform. Three French officers died of natural causes while on parole and were buried with full military honours. Four French officers and five Dutch officers married English women while on parole. The most senior officer on parole from the prison was General Charles Lefebvre-Desnouettes who resided with his wife in Cheltenham from 1809 until they escaped back to France in 1811. General  (1762-1816), Adjutant Commandant was confined here for breaking parole, he was allowed further parole and after again attempting to escape was sent to Chatham.

Clothing
The French prisoners, whose main pastime was gambling, were accused by the British government of selling their clothes and few personal possessions to raise money for further gambling. In 1801, the British government issued statements blaming the French Consul for not supplying sufficient clothing (the British government had paid the French for all English prisoners held in France and French colonies to be clothed). In July 1801 Jeremiah Askew, a tradesman at Yaxley, was convicted of being in possession of palliasses and other articles bearing the government mark of the 'broad arrow'. He was sentenced to stand in the pillory at Norman Cross and two years of hard labour.

Samuel Johnson and a Mr Serle, who visited the barracks, compiled a report on behalf of the British government, stating that the proportion of food allowance was fully sufficient to maintain both life and health, but added: "provided it is not shamefully lost by gambling." The Lords of the Admiralty, along with Doctor Johnson, instructed that naked prisoners should be clothed at once, without waiting for the French supply or payment for clothing.

The British government provided each naked prisoner with a yellow suit, a grey or yellow cap, a yellow jacket, a red waistcoat, yellow trousers, a neckerchief, two shirts, two pairs of stockings, and one pair of shoes. The bright colours were chosen to aid the recognition of escaped prisoners. In Foulley's model of the prison (pictured right) more than half the prisoners are represented wearing these clothes.

Food
Food was prepared by cooks drawn from the prison ranks. The cooks, one for every 12 prisoners, were paid a small allowance by the British government. The initial daily food ration for each prisoner was 1 lb of beef, 1 lb of bread, 1 lb of potatoes, and 1 lb of cabbage or pease. As the majority of prisoners were Roman Catholic, herrings or cod was substituted for beef on Fridays. Each prisoner was also allowed 2oz of soap per week. In November 1797 the British and French governments agreed that each should feed their own citizens in their enemy's prisons. The French provided a daily ration of 1 pint of beer, 8oz of beef or fish, 26oz of bread, 2oz of cheese and 1 lb of potato or fresh vegetables. They were also allowed 1 lb of soap and 1 lb of tobacco per month. Patients in the prison hospital were given a daily ration of 1 pint of tea morning and evening, 16oz of bread, 16oz of beef, mutton or fish, 1 pint of broth, 16oz of green vegetables or potato, and 2 pints of beer.

The British government went to great lengths to provide food of a quality at least equal to that available to locals. The senior officer from each quadrangle was permitted to inspect the food as it was delivered to the prison to ensure it was of sufficient quality.

Despite the generous supply and quality of food, some prisoners died of starvation after gambling away their rations.

Education
Most prisoners were illiterate and were offered the opportunity to learn to read and write in their native language and English. Prisoners who could read were given access to books. News on the progress of the war, including successes and defeats on both sides, was reported to prisoners.

In April 1799 French prisoners at Liverpool were reported to have performed plays by Voltaire in a neat prison theatre they had constructed. In July 1799, Dutch prisoners at Norman Cross sought permission to use one building as a theatre. The Sea Lords refused. However Foulley's model, depicting the prison as it was in about 1809, shows a theatre in the south-west quadrangle.

Religion
There was no prison chapel but a Catholic priest resided in the garrison barracks. From 1808, the former Bishop of Moulins Étienne-Jean-Baptiste-Louis des Gallois de La Tour, who lived in exile at Stilton, was permitted by the Admiralty to minister and provide charity to the prisoners at his own expense. He later became Archbishop of Bourges.

Health
Sick prisoners were initially treated in the prison hospital by two French Navy surgeons and 24 orderlies.

As the number of prisoners increased, disease spread throughout the camp. 1,020 prisoners died in a typhus outbreak in 1800–1801. A special 'typhus cemetery' was dug near the camp.

Leonard Gillespie, Surgeon to the Fleet, wrote in 1804 that pneumonia was common with some cases becoming fatal carditis. There were also many cases of consumption. A brick house for a resident British surgeon was built adjacent to the prison hospital in 1805.

A peculiar outbreak of Nyctalopia or night-blindness affected many of the prisoners in 1806. They became severely dyspeptic and completely blind from sunset until dawn, to the extent that their fitter companions had to lead them around the camp. Various treatments were tried and failed; finally they were cured with black hellebore, given as snuff, which relieved the dyspepsia and restored their night vision within a few days.

A total of 1,770 prisoner deaths were recorded, the majority from disease, during the time the prison was in operation, although the records are incomplete.

Craft and prison economy

At the outbreak of the war, the Transport Board wrote that "the prisoners in all the depots in the country are at full liberty to exercise their industry within the prisons, in manufacturing and selling any articles they may think proper excepting those which would affect the Revenue in opposition to the Laws, obscene toys and drawings, or articles made either from their clothing or the prison stores".

Many prisoners at Norman Cross made artefacts such as toys, model ships and dominoes sets from carved wood or animal bone, and straw marquetry. Examples of the prisoners' craftwork were sold to visitors and passers by. Some highly skilled prisoners were commissioned by wealthy individuals, some of the prisoners becoming very rich in the process. Archdeacon William Strong, a regular visitor to the prison, notes in his diary of 23 October 1801 that he provided a piece of mahogany and paid a prisoner £1 15s 6d to build a model of the Block House and £2 2s for a straw picture of Peterborough Cathedral.

Prisoners were permitted to sell artefacts twice a week at the local market, or daily at the prison gate. Prices were regulated so the prisoners did not undersell local industries. In return, prisoners were permitted to buy additional food, tobacco, wine, clothes or materials for further work. In 1813 ten inmates on behalf of the prisoners were allowed to attend the sale of articles, a long tent was erected in the barrack-yard, where these were exhibited to the visitors, who had purchased articles through the summer, to the amount of £50 to £60 a week.

At the end of the war, the Transport Board noted that some prisoners had earned as much as 100 guineas. An advert in 1814 demonstrated that some items were made collectively and others by a solo craftsman.

Thousands of Norman Cross artefacts survive today in local museums, including 800 in Peterborough Museum, and private collections.
A collection of model ships made at Norman Cross is on display at Arlington Court in Devon.

During December 1804, prisoners Nicholas Deschamps and Jean Roubillard were discovered forging £1 bank notes. Engraved plates of a very high standard and printing implements were found. The former was convicted of forgery and the latter of uttering at the Huntingdon Assizes in 1805. Francois Raize gave evidence for the crown. Forging banknotes was a capital offence at the time. They were sentenced to death but this was commuted. They remained in Huntingdon Gaol until they received a free pardon from the Prince Regent, and were moved to Norman Cross and repatriated with the prisoners of war to France in 1814.

Prisoners at the Norman Cross site were not permitted to manufacture straw hats or bonnets (presumably so as not to impinge upon the local industry). The authorities appear to have enforced this stipulation, at Huntingdon Assizes in May 1811 John Lun, snr (12 months) and three sons (six months) were sentenced to prison for a conspiracy, in endeavouring to persuade the NCO's and privates of the garrison to permit a quantity of straw to be conveyed into the site for the purpose of making straw hats.

Insubordination and escapes

Insubordination was rife among prisoners. A force of Shropshire Militia, a battalion of army reserve and a volunteer force from Peterborough were required to restrain the prisoners from breaking out during a particular period of defiance. As a boy, the author George Borrow lived at the camp from July 1811 to April 1813 with his father Lieutenant Thomas Borrow of the West Norfolk Militia; He described the place in Lavengro.

Six prisoners escaped in April 1801. Three of them were caught at Boston, Lincolnshire and the remaining three were caught in a fishing boat off the Norfolk coast, in the hat of one was found a complete map of the Lincolnshire coast.
Each year the number of attempts to escape increased, as did the numbers in each escape. Three groups of 16 men each escaped in late 1801.

Incomplete tunnels were discovered in 1802.

In October 1804 the press reported the prisoners created a disturbance with the intention of breaking the perimeter fencing. Assistance was sent for to Peterbough. A troop of Yeomanry galloped to support, later followed by two more troops and an infantry unit. The prisoners having cut down a part of the wood enclosure during the night, nine of them effected their escape through the aperture. In another part of the prison, as soon as day light broke it was discovered they had undermined a distance of 34 feet towards the great South road; under the fosse which surrounds the prison, although it is four feet deep, and it is not discovered they had any tools. Five escapees have been taken.

During the night several prisoners escaped in February 1807.
Three escapees were retaken near Ryde heading for Southampton in April 1807.
The agent at the Depot, Captain Pressland R.N. was inviting tenders for the building of a wall, in August 1807. This may have become known to the prisoners as a major escape attempt was made.

After the second of these two major escape attempts in 1804 and 1807, the wooden stockade fence was soon replaced with a brick wall.

One prisoner, Charles Francois Marie Bourchier, stabbed a civilian Alexander Halliday while attempting to escape on 9 September 1808. He was convicted at the Huntingdon Assizes and sentenced to death by hanging. He was taken from Huntingdon Gaol on Friday 16th and executed at Norman Cross in front of the prisoners and the whole garrison. This was the only civil execution at Norman Cross. After the stabbing, the guards having seen two or three other knives, the entire prison was searched and 700 daggers were found.

On the 24th September, 1808 arrived at Calais an English sloop of 44 - tons, called the Margaret Anne, William Tempel, master, of Barton, laden with 18 tons of coals. She was seized in the night of the 20th, in the Humber, by three French prisoners, who had escaped from Norman Cross.
In November 1809 two French Navy officers, escaped by secreting themselves in the soil carts of the prison, in which they were drawn out of the confines of the depot.

In December 1809 an inquest took place on Jean Barthelemy Toohe, a French prisoner of war; who, as he was endeavouring to make his escape over the pailing of the prison, was fired at by the sentinel on duty, and the ball entering his back, he died shortly afterwards.

Duelling continued amongst prisoners. On 15 May 1811 at Norman Cross two fought with scissors attached to sticks. One duellist wounded the survivor twice, before the latter made the thrust that proved fatal.
"On Saturday the 19th an inquisition was taken at Norman Cross Barracks, on view of the body of Julien Cheral, a French prisoner of war, who met his death by a fellow prisoner of the name of Jean Francois Pons stabbing. Verdict — Self Defence.”

In January 1812, a French prisoner was shot whilst escaping after he had overpowered a guard and stolen a bayonet. The guard was committed to Huntingdon Gaol for the next assizes on a charge of manslaughter.

In August 1812 Prosper Louis, 7th Duke of Arenberg, was sent to Norman Cross  after refusing to conform to the new reporting rules of his parole at Bridgnorth, where he was staying with his wife, Stéphanie Tascher de La Pagerie (a niece of Empress Joséphine). After a period he agreed to follow the reporting requirement and was paroled again.

During August 1813, escaped prisoners from Norman Cross were discovered as far away as Hampshire.

Military units 

In July 1810 the Northumberland Militia were inspected at the barracks by Hugh Percy, 2nd Duke of Northumberland. After he had reviewed them, the duke presented the commanding officer with £150 for the regiment to regale themselves with.
On 22 April 1812 the Edinburgh Militia relieved the 2nd West York at Yaxley barracks, and the latter regiment marched to Colchester.
Men from the following units were stationed at the prison:

Arrival and repatriation

Many of the prisoners arrived via Portsmouth or Plymouth and were marched hundreds of miles to Norman Cross.

In April 1797 six transports having on board near 1000 French prisoners disembarked at King's Lynn from Falmouth. The prisoners, under an escort of the Lincoln Militia marched from there to Norman Cross. Most prisoners arrived on foot from Portsmouth, Plymouth, Hull, Great Yarmouth and other ports.
In October 1797, 300 prisoners embarked from Peterborough quay to be exchanged. The sea trip to the continent was by cartel ship.
When the first peace was proclaimed prisoners were taken to Wisbech in lighters to join others in Wisbech Gaol to depart from the Port of Wisbech for France.

Not all prisoners waited for repatriation after the end of the war. A number of the Dutch prisoners having expressed their readiness to enlist into the service of this country, they were taken up by the government; in January 1807 upwards of 60 of them, whose services had been accepted, were marched under an escort of the Pembrokeshire Militia, to Portsmouth, to be distributed on board ships of war.

Peace was finally proclaimed with France in 1814, following Napoleon's defeat and consequent abdication. The prisoners, the garrison guards and local people joined together in celebrations. The first division of 500 prisoners left on 5 April.  The Star reported "We are sorry to add that on their way to the sea coast for embarkation, a few indulged in drinking to such excess, that two of them perished in a fit of intoxication, and nearly thirty were left on the road unable to proceed to their native land. They carry home with them about six thousand pounds in English money, being the profits on the sale of the toys, &c. which they manufactured at the depot".

The remaining prisoners left the garrison by June of 1814. A few decided to remain in England and settled near Yaxley and Stilton.

Demolition and survivals

In  April 1815 '1,000 Yards of capital Board Fencing, now standing round the burial ground appropriated to the late French prisoners, near Norman Cross Inn' were advertised for sale.
The wooden buildings were dismantled in June 1816 and the parts sold at auction. Some of the buildings were relocated to nearby towns although much of the timber structures were sold as firewood.

The site is considered of national importance and has been classified as a scheduled monument. The commander of the depot was the Agent and his house survives, as the Old Governor's House. The restored stables are now a privately owned art gallery. Norman House, the barrack master's house, also survives. Both the Old Governor's House and Norman House are Grade II listed buildings.

Memorial 

The memorial to the 1,770 prisoners who died at Norman Cross was erected in 1914 by the Entente Cordiale Society beside the Great North Road. The bronze Imperial Eagle was stolen in 1990, but replaced with a new one in 2005 following a fundraising appeal.

When a section of the A1 was upgraded to motorway standard in 1998 the memorial required relocating. On 2 April 2005, the Duke of Wellington, a patron of the appeal, unveiled the restored memorial on a new site beside the A15. A replacement bronze eagle, sculpted by John Doubleday, was placed on the re-sited column.

Study 
An archaeological dig was carried out on part of the site and was an episode of the Channel 4 series Time Team in 2009.  Part of the wall, an accommodation block, ablution hut and burial ground were uncovered.

Further reading 
 
 Fort in the Fens

References

External links
 Friends of Norman Cross
 The Fens   Norman Cross pages 20–21
 Time Team Series 17: Death and Dominoes – The First POW Camp (Norman Cross, Cambridgeshire), Wessex Archaeology.
 Norman Cross, Cambridgeshire Flickr collection
 Walker, Thomas James, The Depot for Prisoners of War at Norman Cross, Huntingdonshire, 1796 to 1816, London, Constable, 1913 E-book version (very poorly proof-read)
 Time Team - Norman Cross
 "Once Our Foe - The shooting of Jean DeNarde" - a documentary about the shooting of a prisoner in transit to Norman Cross

Prisons in Cambridgeshire
Monuments and memorials in Cambridgeshire
Prisoner of war camps in England
Scheduled monuments in Cambridgeshire
Defunct prisons in England
Napoleonic Wars
Yaxley, Cambridgeshire